Space 1992: Rise of the Chaos Wizards is the second studio album by Anglo-Swiss symphonic power metal band Gloryhammer. It was released on September 25, 2015. The deluxe edition contains an additional disc of orchestral renditions of the full album, with alternate titles. It reached number 18 in the UK Rock & Metal Charts.

Story
In 1992, a millennium after the events of Tales from the Kingdom of Fife, the evil wizard Zargothrax remains in cryogenic sleep, imprisoned on Triton and guarded by the Space Knights of Crail (“Infernus Ad Astra”). A cult of “unholy chaos wizards” plot his release and attack Triton, defeating the Knights and freeing Zargothrax, who promises to terrorize the galaxy (“Rise of the Chaos Wizards”). The intergalactic warrior prince Angus McFife XIII, descendant of the original Angus McFife, sets out to thwart him once again, wielding the powerful Hammer of Glory, passed down through generations from the original Angus McFife, renamed through its 1000 years to the legendary Astral Hammer (“Legend of the Astral Hammer”).

Zargothrax seeks out the Goblin King, who gives him the crystal key to a secret portal to Hell that lies on Earth beneath Dundee (“Goblin King of the Darkstorm Galaxy”). Meanwhile, McFife is joined by the legendary Hollywood Hootsman (“The Hollywood Hootsman”), the reformed Knights of Crail led by Ser Proletius and Triton survivor Ser Regulon (“Victorious Eagle Warfare”), and the Questlords of Inverness (“Questlords of Inverness, Ride to the Galactic Fortress!”). Both the allied forces (“Heroes [of Dundee]”) and Zargothrax’s demonic army (“Universe on Fire”) prepare for battle in the skies above Mars.

As the opposing forces clash, with heavy casualties for McFife’s allies, Zargothrax returns to Earth where, in the caverns beneath Dundee, he begins a ritual to unleash the hellish Elder God Kor-Virliath upon the galaxy. Warned of the danger by the hermit Ralathor, the Hootsman speeds back to Earth and detonates his body’s neutron star heart, vaporizing the planet and stopping the ritual just in time (“Apocalypse 1992”). Foiled, the furious Zargothrax escapes into another reality through the ensuing chaotic space-time rift, pursued closely by Angus McFife XIII.

Critical reception

Professional reviewers agreed that the album's style and story should not be taken too seriously but lauded the musical quality of the band. The writer for Rock Hard stated even that it was the one of the best Epic power metal releases since Rhapsody's 1997 debut album. While Revolver's reviewer wrote that the "ultra-happy key changes in the choruses of 'Legend of the Astral Hammer' and 'Victorious Eagle Warfare' would put Bon Jovi’s 'Livin’ on a Prayer” to shame', the German edition of Metal Hammer argued that the band was pursuing a risky concept with its overly high-pitched voices.

Track listing

All orchestrations scored and conducted by Ben Turk.

Personnel
Gloryhammer
 Thomas Winkler(Angus McFife XIII) – vocals
 Christopher Bowes(Zargothrax) – keyboards
 Paul Templing(Ser Proletius)  – guitars
 James Cartwright (The Hollywood Hootsman) – bass
 Ben Turk (Ralathor) – drums, orchestration

Choir
 Amy Turk, Dominic Sewell, Laura Trundle

Production
 Lasse Lammert – production, engineering, mixing, mastering
 Dan Goldsworthy – artwork, layout
 Robert Zembrzycki – photography

Charts

References

2015 albums
Napalm Records albums
Gloryhammer albums